The Tuvaluan ambassador in Taipei is the official representative of the Government in Funafuti to the Government of the Republic of China (Taiwan).

List of representatives

References 

Taiwan

Tuvalu